Jacques Plein (born 17 February 1987) is a Luxembourgian footballer, who currently plays for FC Etzella Ettelbruck in Luxembourg's domestic National Division.

Club career
A defender, he has played for Etzella from 2004.

External links
 

1979 births
Living people
Luxembourgian footballers
FC Etzella Ettelbruck players
Luxembourg international footballers
Association football defenders